Freculf (Freculphus Lexoviensis; died 8 October 850 or 852), a Frankish ecclesiastic, diplomat and historian, was a pupil of the palace school of Aachen during the reign of Charlemagne and Bishop of Lisieux from about 824 until his death. He is now best remembered for his universal chronicle, the Twelve Books of Histories (Historiarum libri XII), which is a source of information about the conversion of Gaul and the history of the Franks. Chronicles such as that of Freculf attempted to show world history from Creation to the present, but most history writing in the eighth and ninth centuries was considerably more local and specific.

Early life
Freculf's origins are unknown, but it is known that he became a bishop in either 823 or 825 until his death on 8 October 850 or 852.  He was a pupil of Louis the Pious' chancellor Helisachar and was involved in various issues of the time, including the question of image veneration. He was described as a ‘busy, well-connected man’.  Some have observed that Freculf was the first medieval writer to see the post-Roman world as something different. He writes that:

Envoy to the Pope
Freculf was sent by Louis to Rome to negotiate with Pope Eugene II about the veneration of images in 824. This issue was one of the main points of contention in the Church at the time. The East Roman Emperor at the time, Michael II, was initially tolerant towards those who venerated images (see Iconoclasm). However, later on in his reign he started persecuting all those who worshiped these images. However, the Franks allowed for veneration, although not adoration, of images. He asked Louis the Pious to persuade Pope Eugene II to ban veneration. Louis complied and one of the envoys he sent was Freculf. However this Frankish embassy failed as Eugene II stated that the second Council of Nicaea had already decided that images can be venerated but should not be adored.

Twelve Histories
One of Freculf's most important works was his Twelve Books of Histories in two volumes. When he wrote the second part ‘he dedicated it to Empress Judith as a gift for her son Charles [the Bald]’.  He hoped that this book would ‘enable princes to take precautions against disadvantages to themselves and to their subjects’. In a letter to Empress Judith of Bavaria, Freculf flatters the empress while at the same time claiming that her son Charles was so like Charlemagne that ‘his grandfather seems not to have died, but rather with the fog of sleep wiped away, to illumine the world anew, indeed his immortal wit, elegance and virtue shine in the grandson together with the name.’  Empress Judith encouraged this comparison of Charles to Charlemagne, something that he would be reminded of throughout his reign. However, the influence of Charlemagne was to go way beyond the reign of Charles the Bald.  Freculf also mentioned in his book that he hoped Charles would be ‘our king of a new age’. Freculf also sent Charles the Bald a copy of the military treatise De re militari by Vegetius.

Freculf's work, along with Ado of Vienne’s chronicle, are the only examples of chronicles encompassing world history until the late twelfth century.  It was only after the 13th century that world chronicles would become more numerous. This work provided an excellent example of how important tradition was for the Carolingians. Part One of the book narrates the history from the creation of the world to the birth of Jesus Christ.  The second part consisted of the history from incarnation of Jesus up until around 600AD.  His work was centered mainly religious aspects, such as the Visigothic conversion to Catholicism, admiration of Pope Gregory I as a ‘defender of the faith’, all the martyrs, and all six ecumenical councils up until that point. This text, which is often neglected due to its lack of new factual information of contemporary events...crafts a history meant to address present concerns through the 'mirror' of the past.

However, Freculf did not use the customary ages-of-the-world or chronological models for organizing his material.  Instead he traced history through the fall and rise of potentates, realms, and cults through pagan, pre-Roman antiquity, and then through Israel.  He only mentioned Rome because it allowed for peace and prosperity, paving the way for the Church to grow.

Manuscripts 
Manuscripts of his chronicle include:
 "Auxerre - BM - ms. 0091". Origin (Pontigny Abbey Notre-Dame)
 "Avranches - BM - ms. 0160". Origin (Mont-Saint-Michel)

Literature 
 Natumewicz, C. F. "Freculphus of Lisieux, His Chronicle and a Mont Saint-Michel Manuscript." Horae Eruditae et Codices sancti Michaelis de periculo maris, 90–134. Steenbrugge: 1966. HS 90-1800 Multiple authors: MICHAUD-QUANTIN P., CORDOLIANI A., MATHIEU M., JEAUNEAU E., NATUNEWICZ Ch.-F., PREAUX J. & SCHNEYER J.B. 

 Frechulfi Lexouiensis episcopi Opera omnia. Ed. Michael I. Allen. 2 vols. (1. Prolegomena – Indices; 2. Textus). Corpus Christianorum, Continuatio Mediaeualis 169–169A. Turnhout: Brepols, 2002.

References

External links 
 Opera Omnia by Migne Patrologia Latina with analytical indexes

Bishops in the Carolingian Empire
Bishops of Lisieux
French chroniclers
Historians from the Carolingian Empire
9th-century Latin writers